Louisa Lydia Alexander (November 2, 1836 - August 18, 1911) was a lifelong educator and one of the first African American women to attend Oberlin College. Oberlin was the first American institution to admit female students, and one of the first to admit black students.

Biography
Alexander was born at Mays Lick, Kentucky on November 2, 1836 to Henry Alexander (b. 1802) and Lucy Alexander (b. 1803). Henry was born into slavery, but successfully purchased his freedom when he was 21 years old. He became a merchant and was listed in the 1840 U.S. Federal Census as a free man. At some point, Henry may have purchased his wife's freedom. Lucy Alexander was listed in the 1850 U.S. Federal Census as a free woman. The couple had five daughters: Louisa Lydia; Lucy; Lemira (attended Oberlin 1853-1854); Rachel (attended Oberlin 1862-1864); and Maria Ann (1826-1905) (educator, attended Oberlin 1852-1854, married to Mifflin Wistar Gibbs, an African-American attorney, judge, diplomat and banker).

Alexander entered Oberlin in 1850 and graduated from the Ladies Teaching course in 1856.  After graduation, she taught school in several Southern towns including: Charleston, South Carolina; Marietta, Georgia; Henderson, Kentucky; Cumberland, Mississippi; Red Banks, Mississippi; Mays Lick, Kentucky; St. Mark, Alabama; and Giles Plantation, Mississippi.

Alexander died in Washington, DC, August 18, 1911 and was buried in Oberlin Westwood Cemetery.

References

People from Mason County, Kentucky
1836 births
1911 deaths
Oberlin College alumni
African-American schoolteachers
Schoolteachers from Kentucky
Kentucky women in education
20th-century African-American people
20th-century African-American women